Q9 may  refer to:

 The fifth series of Q (TV series)
 The IATA airline designator of Afrinat International Airlines
 Q9 input method - an input method for Traditional Chinese text
 Q9 (New York City bus)
 MQ-9 Reaper, an American unmanned aircraft.
 Q9 Networks Inc. - Company that provides Internet and data centre services. 
 Quran 9, at-Tawbah the 9th chapter of the Islamic Holy book